Union of the Left may refer to:

 Union of the Left (France)
 Union of the Left (Poland)

See also 
 Left Union (disambiguation)
 The Union (Italy)
 Union of the Socialist Left
 United Left (disambiguation)